Graptasura mesilau is a moth of the subfamily Arctiinae. It was described by Jeremy Daniel Holloway in 2001. It is found on Borneo. The habitat consists of montane forests.

The length of the forewings is about 10 mm.

References

 

Lithosiini
Moths described in 2001